Kiros was a Canadian rock and punk band formed in 2002 in Calgary.

The band's name, Kiros, comes from the Greek word meaning "a moment of divine time". Kiros has played in such gigs as the Spring Break 08 Tour (with The Audition, Hit the Lights, Every Avenue and The Morning Light), the Class of 08 Tour (with There for Tomorrow and VersaEmerge), the Canadian Bacon Eh Tour with School Boy Humor, Broadway, and the Back to School 08 tour with Showbread, Oceana, and Before We Forget, the Drive Thru Canadian Invasion Tour and the 2003, 2004, 2005 Warped Tour, Thee Summer Bailout Tour 09 (with Emery, Maylene And The Sons Of Disaster, Ivoryline, Secret and Whisper, and Closure In Moscow), The Terminatour 09 (with Blessed By A Broken Heart, Agraceful, Vanna, Love Hate Hero, Karate High School and In Fear and Faith), the 2010 Inside Out Tour (with Seventh Day Slumber and December Radio), and the 2010 Are You Listening Tour (with Emery, Queens Club and Sent by Ravens).

They have played alongside such bands as Emery (band), Allister, The All-American Rejects, Seventh Day Slumber, Pillar, Fireflight, Thousand Foot Krutch, Lovedrug, Straylight Run and Relient K. They were briefly signed to Torque/Victory Records in 2007 and released one album titled A Single Strand, but have since parted from the label and re-released A Single Strand independently.

Kiros has been featured on many festivals such as Soulfest, The Bamboozle, Cornerstone, TOMfest, Lifest, Rocfest, Pro Life, Rock and Rail, and Creation Festival.  They are managed by Anthony "YOGI" Allgood from Outerloop Management in Washington, D.C., the same company which showcases Christian heavy hitters Emery. In July 2011 Kiros signed with Ain't No Grave Records, a division of Century Media. They finished up their latest full-length album with producer Mark Lee Townsend (Relient K, The Wedding), entitled "Lay Your Weapons Down" which was released in 2012.

In 2013, Kiros embarked on a North America wide farewell tour. The band played their final show on October 25, 2013, at First Baptist Church in Lloydminster, performing songs from all of their albums and were joined by all past and present band members.

Members 
Final Lineup
 Barry Mackichan (vocals, bass)
 Ryan Guerra (guitar)
 Kurt Billey (drums)
 Jonathan Lujan (guitar/vocals)
 Bill Caverly (electric kazoo/harpsichord)

Former
 Tyler Wells (drums)
 Justen Gordon (drums)
 Chris Pond (drums)
 Jon Purschke (guitar)
 Neil Klammer (guitar)
 Dougie Parker (guitar)
 Malcolm Setter (guitar)

Management
 Anthony "Yogi" Allgood (Outerloop Management)

Discography 
Studio albums
 Counterproductive (2002)
 A Single Strand (Canada: 2007, USA: 2008)
 Lay Your Weapons Down (2012)

EPs
 Fight the Night (2004)
 Kiros (2005)
 The Hurricane (2009)
 Outlaws and Prodigals EP (2011)
Songs on compilations
 Launch: Ignition, "Save the World" (CMC, 2005)

Awards 
GMA Canada Covenant Awards

 2008 Rock Song Of The Year: "Alone Tonight"
 2008 nominee, Modern Rock/Alternative Album Of The Year: A Single Strand
 2008 nominee, Hard Music Song Of The Year: "Of Wolves And Angels (Anthem For The Insomniac)"
 2008 nominee, Modern Rock/Alternative Song Of The Year: "Strengthen Me"

External links 
 
 Purevolume: Kiros
 Kiros at MySpace

Musical groups established in 2002
Musical groups from Calgary
Canadian Christian rock groups
2002 establishments in Alberta